Ceferino Conrad Rodríguez Noda (born 16 September 1988) is a Spanish professional boxer. He held the European welterweight title from 2016 to 2017 and the European Union welterweight title from 2013 to 2014.

Early life
Hailing from Las Palmas in the Canary Islands, Ceferino Rodríguez Noda was born into a family of boxers. His grandfather, Ceferino Rodríguez Duque, was the patriarch and competed as a lightweight in the early days of the sport. His father, also named Ceferino, was a four-time champion of the Canary Islands during his career. Then came two of his uncles, Isidro and Carmelo, who were known as Ferino III and IV.

Rodríguez Noda, a.k.a. Ferino V, was overweight as a young child and, for his thirteenth birthday, asked to join a boxing gym in order to lose weight. Within three months he had his first fight, although it didn't go well as his opponent was more experienced. After dropping some weight and improving in the ring, he went to his first Canarian Championships, winning a bronze medal. Shortly thereafter he asked his first opponent for a rematch and was able to beat him. In his amateur career, he amassed a record of 80–6–2. In addition, he was a nine-time champion of the Canary Islands as well as a two-time Spanish national champion.

Professional career
Rodríguez made his professional debut on 26 November 2010, defeating Christian Kamara by fourth-round technical knockout (TKO) in Las Palmas. On 20 April 2012, in his seventh bout, he beat compatriot and fellow Canarian David Pulido for the vacant Spanish welterweight title. After a 12–0 start he faced Italian veteran Stefano Castellucci in Italy on 18 October 2013 for the vacant European Union welterweight title, winning the fight by seventh-round TKO in his first fight outside of his native Spain. He successfully defended his belt two months later with a unanimous decision (UD) victory over Daniel Rasilla, and retained a second time by knocking out Ismael El Massoudi at the Gran Canaria Arena in Las Palmas five months after that. Rodríguez vacated the title soon thereafter after declining an opportunity to defend it for a third time.

He suffered his first defeat on 11 April 2015, losing to Mohamed Mimoune in Benidorm by way of unanimous decision; his record fell to 18–1. In his next bout on 11 July he picked up the interim WBC Latino welterweight title with a 12-round unanimous decision victory over Aitor Nieto. Later that month it was announced that Rodríguez had signed a deal with Sampson Lewkowicz of Sampson Boxing, who promised to secure him more fights on international soil. After stopping an undefeated Davide Doria in five rounds in Las Palmas, he made his U.S. debut on 27 February 2016, defeating Edgar Riovalle by unanimous decision at the Honda Center in Anaheim, California. On 13 May he defended his WBC Latino title against Carlos Saul Chumbita in Argentina, scoring two knockdowns in the first round before securing a TKO in the second to retain his belt.

On 2 December 2016 he defeated Frenchman Ahmed El Mousaoui by split decision in Las Palmas for the vacant European welterweight title. Five months later, on 13 May 2017, he defended his title against Sam Eggington in Birmingham, with Eggington's WBC International welterweight title also on the line. The Englishman knocked Rodríguez out with a powerful left hook in the tenth round, sending him crashing through the ropes to take his European belt. After the loss he returned home to the Canary Islands to help with the family business in Jinámar, citing a lack of funds to continue boxing for the time being. After more than nine months, he made his return to the ring on 2 March 2018, defeating Elvin Pérez by points in Las Palmas.

Professional boxing record

References

External links
 

Living people
1988 births
Spanish male boxers
Welterweight boxers
European Boxing Union champions
Sportspeople from Las Palmas
People from Telde
Sportspeople from the Province of Las Palmas
20th-century Spanish people
21st-century Spanish people